PSDR may refer to the Romanian-language initials of:

Social Democratic Party of Romania (1910–18)
Romanian Social Democratic Party (1927–48)
Romanian Social Democratic Party (1990–2001)